A creature performer can be:
 a costumed performer
 an actor engaged in motion-capture acting